Dal-ja's Spring is a 2007 South Korean romantic comedy television series starring Chae Rim, Lee Min-ki, Lee Hyun-woo, Lee Hye-young and Gong Hyung-jin. It aired on KBS2 from January 3 to March 15, 2007 on Wednesdays and Thursdays at 21:55 for 22 episodes.

Chae Rim won a Top Excellence Award in Acting at the 2007 KBS Drama Awards.

Plot
Oh Dal-ja is a managing director at a home shopping network. 33 years old and single, marriage is heavy on her mind, mostly due to societal and familial pressure. Although she has everything - a successful career, supportive friends, a loving family - she still dreams of the perfect romance and marriage. She falls for her flirty colleague Shin Se-do, but after he dumps her for Wee Seon-joo, the stylish host of the home shopping TV show, Dal-ja decides to seek revenge. Enter Kang Tae-bong, a guy 6 years younger with a mysterious past. For  (approximately ), Tae-bong signs a dating contract with Dal-ja to pretend to be her boyfriend for three months. But then Dal-ja meets Uhm Ki-joong, seemingly the perfect man: rich, good-looking, intelligent, and courteous, but recently separated from his wife. For the first time in her life, Dal-ja finds herself in a love triangle.

Dal-ja's Spring comically and candidly deals with issues in Korean society, such as women dating younger men, the everyday social pressures encountered by single women over 30, and mothers juggling work and family.

Cast

Main characters
Chae Rim as Oh Dal-ja
33-year-old home shopping channel managing director. She's extremely good at her job, but is a disaster at her love life. Even though she's in her thirties and considered an "old maid," she's naive and inexperienced with men and still has girlish dreams of a grand romance. She initially hires a boyfriend by contract, Kang Tae-bong, to seek revenge on a cheating ex, but finds that she enjoys having him around.

Lee Min-ki as Kang Tae-bong
27-year-old freelancer for a proxy dating agency. Dal-ja hires him as her pretend boyfriend, but he soon develops genuine feelings for her. He has a frank and outspoken personality, but beneath is a warm and nurturing nature. Seemingly a debt-ridden slacker, Tae-bong actually comes from a rich family, but he gave up his career as a lawyer, and dreams of becoming a chef.

Lee Hyun-woo as Uhm Ki-joong
36-year-old successful businessman who heads an importing firm of foreign brand goods. He's the perfect catch on paper: smart, rich, polite, and cultured. But he hides a secret obsession with cleaning, and is recently separated from his wife. The more he encounters Dal-ja, the more he grows attracted to her.

Lee Hye-young as Wee Seon-joo
33-year-old home shopping network show host. A former top model, she disappeared from the public eye when she married at 29, then returned three years later as a divorcee. Seon-joo is something of a diva, and constantly gets on Dal-ja's nerves. She is a master at the dating game, and with her charms and wiles, she can bring any man to heel, including Shin Se-do. But more importantly, Seon-joo always knows her self worth, which earns Dal-ja's grudging admiration. After a small glimpse into Seon-joo's vulnerability, the two women later form an unlikely friendship.

Gong Hyung-jin as Shin Se-do
Home shopping network TV director. He and Dal-ja get along as colleagues, and thinking he's a nice guy, she develops a crush on him and begins dating him. But belying his average looks, Se-do is actually the office playboy, and he quickly dumps her when she tells him she's not quite ready for a sexual relationship. But Se-do gets his comeuppance when he falls in love for real with the equally commitment phobic Seon-joo.

Supporting characters
Seo Young-hee as Jang Soo-jin, Tae-bong's ex-girlfriend
Lee Kyung-jin as Jung Jung-ae, Dal-ja's mother
Kim Young-ok as Lee Kkeut-soon, Dal-ja's grandmother
Kil Yong-woo as Kang Soon-hong, Tae-bong's father
Kwon Ki-sun as Son Young-shim, Tae-bong's mother
Kim Na-woon as Go Soon-ae, Dal-ja's pregnant best friend and colleague
Jang Young-nam as Ki-joong's ex-wife
Yang Hee-kyung as Team leader Kang
Kim Sung-kyum as Tae-bong's grandfather
Oh Kyung-soo as Nam Dae-soo, department director
Kim Jae-wook as Choon-ha, Tae-bong's friend working at Dongdaemun Market
Seo Young as Hong Ji-hee
Kim In-tae as Se-do's father
Choi Eun-seo as Hee-yeon
Lee Mi-so as Ki-joong's secretary

Ratings

Source: TNS Media Korea

Soundtrack
 기적 같은 사랑 - Lee Kyung-hwa 
 Sweet Lover - Park Hye-kyung 
 To You Mine - Pearl's Day 
 추억을 열다 - Soyeon 
 내 손을 잡아줘 - K-Jun 
 나쁜 사랑 - M.R.J (Kang Jae-hyuk)
 심장 - Eun-young 
 Impression 
 Ya-Ya-Ya
 추억을 열다 (Inst.)
 Lively Breeze 
 Surprise 
 To You Mine (Funky Ver.) 
 Miracle (Orchestra Ver.) 
 너에 기억
 기적 같은 사랑 (Original Ver.)

Awards and nominations

References

External links
Dal-ja's Spring official KBS website 

Dal-ja's Spring at KoreanWiz

Korean Broadcasting System television dramas
2007 South Korean television series debuts
2007 South Korean television series endings
Korean-language television shows
South Korean romantic comedy television series
Television shows written by Kang Eun-kyung
Television series by Kim Jong-hak Production